Crossing All Borders is an LP by Latin hip hop duo Tha Mexakinz. It was released on April 14, 1998, by Fluid Recordings.

Track listing
"Rain on Your Parade"
"La Plaga"
"Lose My Cool"
"Burnin"
"Cok Bak da Hamma!"
"2 Many MC's"
"Phonkie Melodia III"
"Plead Insanity"

References

1998 albums
Tha Mexakinz albums